Elizabeth Kunkel House is a historic home located near Martinsburg, Berkeley County, West Virginia. It was built in 1907 and is a two-story, "L"-shaped, Late Victorian Gothic-style wood frame dwelling.  It measures 40 feet wide and 50 feet deep, with a gable roof, and sits on a stone foundation. It features two steeply pitched Gothic dormers. Also on the property are an early-20th century frame smokehouse and storage building.

It was listed on the National Register of Historic Places in 1991.

References 

Houses on the National Register of Historic Places in West Virginia
Gothic Revival architecture in West Virginia
Houses completed in 1907
Houses in Berkeley County, West Virginia
National Register of Historic Places in Martinsburg, West Virginia